The 1996 Amstel Gold Race was the 31st edition of the annual road bicycle race "Amstel Gold Race", held on Sunday April 27, 1996, in the Dutch province of Limburg. The race stretched 253 kilometres, with the start in Heerlen and the finish in Maastricht. There were a total of 192 competitors, with 84 cyclists finishing the race and the first ever Italian winner.

Result

External links
Results

Amstel Gold Race
1996 in road cycling
1996 in Dutch sport
Amstel Gold Race
April 1996 sports events in Europe